The wagon tragedy also known as wagon massacre was an incident which occurred during the Malabar rebellion against British colonial rule in India that led to the deaths of 70 Indian prisoners. In 1921, a rebellion against British colonial rule by Mappila Muslims broke out in the Malabar District of British India. Following the rebellion, 100 Mappila prisoners who had been taken into custody were ordered by the colonial authorities to be transferred from the Malabar Coast to Podanur as the jails in the Malabar District were overcrowded. Thousands of Mappila prisoners were transported to other regions of British India during and after the rebellion via train, though they were typically transported in open-air carriages in order to prevent suffocation.

However, for unknown reasons, the 100 prisoners (who were being transported in November of that year) were sent to Podanur in a closed train carriage by the sergeant and transport officer in charge of their detention and transfer. On November 10, they were moved into the carriage and the train set off for Podanur. Air soon ran out in the carriage and several prisoners began to die due to asphyxiation. By the time the train arrived at the Podanur Junction railway station on November 19, the carriage was opened by local authorities which discovered that 64 prisoners had died.

The 36 surviving prisoners were taken to a nearby hospital, where a further six died of the injuries their bodies had sustained, bringing the total death toll up to 70 people. A prisoner later described his experiences on the train while it was in transit: "we were perspiring profusely and we realized that air was insufficient and we could not breathe. We were so thirsty that some of us licked the perspiration from our clothes. I saw something like gauze over the door with very small holes so that no air could come in. Some of us tried to put it away but we were not strong enough."

When news of the incident became public, there was a public outcry in British India at the colonial authorities over their perceived negligence. Several prominent Muslims dispatched telegraphs to British colonial officials in Delhi, including the Earl of Cromer, demanding an investigation into the incident. The British responded by opening an inquiry into the deaths, which eventually convicted and sentenced the carriage manufacturer, transport officer and sergeant for negligence in sending the prisoners to Podanur in a close carriage instead of an open-air one. The incident ultimately contributed to an increase in support for the Indian independence movement. A memorial to the incident was subsequently constructed at Tirur.

See also
 Khilafat Movement
 Malabar rebellion
 Patharighat massacre
 Non-cooperation movement
 History of India

References

External links
Events surrounding the Wagon Tragedy described at the Government of Kerala website

1921 in British India
1921 in India
April 1921 events
Railway accidents and incidents in Tamil Nadu
Railway accidents in 1921
History of Kerala
Indian independence movement in Kerala
1921 disasters in India